General elections were held in Sweden between 3 and 24 September 1911, the first election in Sweden with universal male suffrage. The Free-minded National Association (FL) emerged as the largest party, winning 102 of the 230 seats in the Second Chamber of the Riksdag.

As a result of the election, the General Electoral League's Arvid Lindman resigned as Prime Minister and was replaced by FL leader Karl Staaff.

Results

References

General elections in Sweden
Sweden
General
Sweden